The Apostolic Nunciature in the Philippines is a top-level diplomatic mission assigned by the Holy See to the Philippines, located at 2140 Taft Avenue, Malate, Manila. 

Diplomatically, an Apostolic Nuncio may be equivalent to an ambassador, and often carries the ecclesial title of archbishop. The nuncio works closely with the Archdiocese of Manila, and is by custom the doyen of the diplomatic corps.

History
The Apostolic Nunciature in the Philippines was erected circa 1902. Though the official residence of the nuncio is located in Manila, he is not subject to the Archbishop of Manila.

World War II 
When the Philippines was caught in World War II following the commencement of the Japanese Invasion of East Asia, communication between the Holy See and the Philippine Delegation (Msgr. Guglielnao Piani, SDB), or any of the other delegations of the region, was not permitted. However, the Apostolic Delegation in Tokyo (Msgr. Paolo Marella) was permitted to communicate with the censored delegations.

In 1943, the Second Philippine Republic was inaugurated. In a letter dated October 14, 1943 (the day of the inauguration), the newly elected President of the puppet government, Jose P. Laurel, wrote to Luigi Cardinal Maglione, the Vatican Secretary of State:

Although, Cardinal Maglione received the telegram, he told the Japanese Ambassador to the Holy See, Ken Harada, that as long as the war continues, the Holy See will not recognize any new states, including the new Philippine Republic. Harada acknowledged the Holy See's decision and did not pursue the matter further. Later, Cardinal Maglione directed Msgr. Piani, through Msgr. Marella, to continue to pursue and protect the interests of the Catholic religion in the country. He added that the local bishops are permitted to deal with local ecclesiastical affairs as long as they are not diplomatic in character. However, they could, if necessary, appeal to the authorities on affairs that are purely ecclesiastical. 

The Apostolic Delegation helped clear up a misunderstanding that Msgr. Paul Taguchi, Archbishop of Osaka, visited Manila not to supplant the authority of the Archbishop of Manila but to establish contacts with the Catholics of that city.

Rumors were also spreading that Pope Pius XII personally communicated a telegram to Laurel. Maglione clarified via a letter to the Apostolic Delegate in London that since the Holy See did not recognize any new states for the duration of the war, no such telegram was ever sent.

Role in the hierarchy: vicariates

As an apostolic vicar, the nuncio also serves a role in the hierarchy of the Catholic Church. An apostolic vicariate is a territorial jurisdiction established in areas which do not have a diocese and the nuncio serves as metropolitan bishop to these vicariates. 

In the Philippines, the apostolic vicariates are:

Apostolic Vicariate of Bontoc-Lagawe
Apostolic Vicariate of Calapan
Apostolic Vicariate of Jolo
Apostolic Vicariate of Puerto Princesa
Apostolic Vicariate of San Jose in Mindoro
Apostolic Vicariate of Tabuk
Apostolic Vicariate of Taytay

List of papal representatives to the Philippines

Apostolic Delegates 
In 1900 a Papal Legation with the rank of Apostolic Delegation in the Philippines was established. There have been seven Apostolic Delegates of the Philippines, until the Vatican promoted the Papal Legation in the Philippines to the status of Apostolic Nunciature on August 9, 1951.

Apostolic Nuncios

See also
Holy See–Philippines relations
List of diplomatic missions of the Holy See
List of diplomatic missions in the Philippines
Foreign relations of the Holy See
Foreign relations of the Philippines
Catholic Church in the Philippines
Embassy of the Philippines to the Holy See

References

External links
Catholic Hierarchy

Philippines
Holy See
Buildings and structures in Malate, Manila
Catholic Church in the Philippines
Holy See–Philippines relations